Freistroff (Lorraine Franconian: Freeschdroff) is a commune in the Moselle department in Grand Est in north-eastern France.

Localities of the commune: Diding (German: Didingen), Guiching.

See also
 Communes of the Moselle department

References

External links
 

Communes of Moselle (department)